Prizren is a city in Kosovo. 

Prizren may also refer to:

Territorial entities
Prizren District (disambiguation)
District of Prizren, the district of which the city serves as the capital
Prizren District (Serbia), claimed district of Serbia, corresponding to the above and under Kosovan control
Prizren Municipality, the municipality of the city
Prizren Vilayet, vilayet (province) of the Ottoman Empire
Sanjak of Prizren, sanjak (district) of the Ottoman Empire
 Roman Catholic Diocese of Prizren, former diocese of Catholic Church, that existed until 1969
 Apostolic Administration of Prizren, current apostolic administration of Catholic Church, that exists since 2000
 Serbian Orthodox Diocese of Prizren, former eparchy of Serbian Orthodox Church, that existed until 1818

Other
League of Prizren, Albanian league in the Ottoman Empire
Prizren Fortress, a fortress in th